Calling All Lovers is the fourth studio album by American R&B singer Tamar Braxton. It was released on October 2, 2015, by Epic Records and Streamline Records. The album was preceded by the release of two singles — "Let Me Know" and "If I Don't Have You".

The album debuted at number five in the United States, debuting with 43,000 units (38,000 in album sales) in the United States. The album's second single, "If I Don't Have You" was released on May 27, 2015, and was nominated for Best R&B Performance at the 58th Annual Grammy Awards, becoming Braxton's fourth nomination.

Background and release
On October 7, 2014, Braxton's single, "Let Me Know" featuring Future, was released. The song peaked at number 2 on the Billboard Trending 140 Chart, less than an hour, after its premiere on Braxton's official SoundCloud account and it eventually reached at number one by 12:00 AM. Billboard.com gave the song 4 out of 5 stars in its review of "The Best and Worst Singles of the Week" for the second week of October 2014. Braxton performed "If I Don't Have You" at the BET's 15th Annual Awards 2015 on June 28, 2015 and at Mega Fest 2015 on August 21, 2015.

On September 6, 2015, Target confirmed that Calling All Lovers would miss its scheduled release date of September 11, 2015 due to a "street date change". On September 11, 2015, the deluxe version of the album became available for pre-order on iTunes with a track listing of 16 items and a new release date of October 2, 2015. Braxton performed "King" on the daytime show, The Real on September 14, 2015. Braxton performed "Circles" on The Wendy Williams Show on October 1, 2015.

Singles
"Let Me Know" was released on October 7, 2014 as the album's lead single. The song samples late R&B singer Aaliyah 1994 hit single "At Your Best (You Are Love)". The song appeared on five Billboard charts. On October 25, 2014, the song debuted at number 20 on the Heatseekers Songs chart spending only one week in the chart. On December 6, 2014, the song peaked at number 12 on the Hot R&B Songs chart in its 20th week on the chart.
The song also appeared on the Adult R&B Songs, R&B/Hip-Hop Airplay and the Hot R&B/Hip-Hop Songs charts at numbers 5, 8 and 31.

"If I Don't Have You" was released as the album's second single on May 27, 2015, . The music video for "If I Don't Have You" was released on VEVO on July 9, 2015. The song peaked at number eighteen on the Hot R&B Songs chart on August 1, 2015 and number six on the Adult R&B Songs chart on August 15, 2015. It received a nomination for the Grammy Award for Best R&B Performance at the 58th Annual Grammy Awards.

Other singles
"Catfish" was released as the first promotional single on September 12, 2015. "Angels & Demons", was released as the second promotional single on September 18, 2015. The music video for "Angels & Demons" was released on VEVO on September 17, 2015. "Circles" was released as the final promotional single from Calling All Lovers on September 25, 2015. On November 24, 2018 three years after the album release, a music video of "Love It" was released.

Commercial performance
The album debuted at number 5 on the US Billboard 200, with first-week sales of 43,000 units (38,000 in album sales) in the United States. The album also peaked at number 2 on the US Top R&B/Hip-Hop Albums and number 16 on the UK R&B Albums charts.

Critical response

Calling All Lovers was met with generally positive reviews from music critics. Andy Kellman of AllMusic gave the album three and a half out of five stars, saying, "The album starts in scattered fashion with some neo-reggae, a retro-modern midtempo groove that evokes breakbeat-driven early-'90s productions, and a church-ified ballad. After those three songs, the album stabilizes, sliding between a number of plush ballads and sophisticated but bumping slow jams. Heartache prevails during the first half and crests with 'Never,' an authoritative and elegantly paced kiss-off of an inappreciative lover. The latter half is mostly about devotion and awe, while the back-to-back 'Love It' (all booming bass, tapping keyboards, and rattling percussion) and 'Must Be Good to You' (light and springy disco-funk) turn it up several degrees with Braxton offering firm declarations of her sexual power."

Track listing

Notes
  signifies a co-producer
  signifies a vocal producer

Sample credits
 "Never" contains an interpolation of "I'm Dancing For Your Love", written by Patricia Austin, Peggy Lipton Jones, John Robertson and David James Wolinski.
 "I Love You" contains a portion of the composition "If Only for One Night", written by Brenda Gordon Russell.
 "Let Me Know" samples "(At Your Best) You Are Love" performed by Aaliyah, written by Ronald Isley, Ernie Isley, Rudolph Isley, O'Kelly Isley, Jr. and Chris Jasper.

Credits and personnel
Credits adapted from AllMusic.
 Performers and musicians

Tamar Braxton - Vocals, Background
Tiyon "TC" Mack - Vocals, Background

 Technical personnel

Tamar Braxton - Composer, Producer, Creative Director,
Antonio "L.A." Reid	Executive Producer
Vincent Herbert - A&R, Executive Producer
LaShawn Daniels - A&R, Composer
Ramahn "Jer-Z" Herbert - A&R
Ashley Fox - Creative Director
Anita Marisa Boriboon - Art Direction, Creative Director, Design
Theo "MasBeatz" Edmonds - Producer
The Underdogs - Composer, Producer
Rivelino Raoul Wouter - Producer
Blair Taylor - Producer
Afro Steve - Producer
Cedric "DaBenchWarma" Smith - Producer
Polow da Don - Producer
Brian Alexander Morgan	- Bass, Composer, Drum Programming, Keyboards, Producer
Mel & Mus - Producer
Melvin Hough - Producer
Gerald Haddon -Producer
John Henry Gordon - Producer
Tiffany Fred - Composer, Producer
Leigh Elliott - Producer
Da Internz - Producer
Brandon Bell - Composer, Producer
Blac Elvis - Producer
Alessandro Calemme - Producer
Khari Cain - Composer, Producer
Darhyl "DJ" Camper Jr. - Composer, Producer
Tiyon Mack - Composer, Mixing, Vocal Engineer,
Keon Young - Composer
David James Wolinski - Composer
Dewain Whitmore, Jr. - Composer
Isaac White - Composer
Kristal "Brave Jaxon" Murphy
Atozzio Towns - Composer
Damon Thomas - Composer
Amber Streeter	- Composer
Patrick "J Que" Smith - Composer
Edsel Alexander - Composer
Makeba Riddick	- Composer
Tony Russell - Composer
Muhammad Ayers - Composer
Brenda Russell	Composer
Marcos Palacios - Composer
Vurdell Muller	- Composer
McKenzie Brooke Lawson - Composer
Sherita Lowery - Composer
Kevin Randolph - Composer
Peggy Lipton Jones - Composer
Denisia Keys - Composer
Claude Kelly - Composer
Jamal Jones - Composer
Andrew Hey - Engineer, Guitar
Patricia Austin - Composer
Timothy Paul Hinshaw - Composer
Atia Boggs - Composer
Courtney Harrell - Composer
Anthony D. Bennett - Composer
Ernest Clark - Composer
Candice Boyd - Composer
Larry Griffin Jr. - Composer
Kameron Glasper - Composer
Gene Grimaldi - Mastering
Dave Boyd - Assistant
Brandon N. Caddell - Mixing
Zach Nicholls - Mixing
Harvey Mason, Jr. - Composer, Mixing
Dashawn "Happie" White - Composer,  Producer 
Robert Ector - Photography

Charts

Weekly charts

Year-end charts

Release history

References

2015 albums
Epic Records albums
Tamar Braxton albums
Albums produced by Da Internz
Albums produced by Harmony Samuels
Albums produced by Lee Major
Albums produced by Needlz
Albums produced by Polow da Don
Albums produced by Symbolyc One
Albums produced by the Underdogs (production team)